Daniel Anthony Seaborne (born 5 March 1987) is a retired English professional footballer who played as a defender.

Seaborne began his professional career at Exeter City, having risen through the club's youth system; he signed his professional contract in May 2005. Seaborne had numerous loan spells during his time at Exeter, including moves to Clyst Rovers, Tiverton Town and Dorchester Town. In January 2010, Seaborne signed a -year contract with Southampton. Having made 44 appearances for the club, Seaborne was released by the Premier League side in June 2013. Following his release, Seaborne spent time at clubs including AFC Bournemouth, Yeovil Town and Coventry City. In August 2014, Seaborne signed for Scottish Premiership side Partick Thistle on a two-year contract. He joined Hamilton Academicals in 2016 but was released the following year. After six months without a club, he rejoined Exeter City in December 2017.

Career

Exeter City
Seaborne was born in Barnstaple, Devon. A defender who plays at centre half or left back, he began his football career as a trainee with Exeter City, and signed his first professional contract in May 2005. He spent several spells on loan, to Clyst Rovers in the 2004–05 season, Tiverton Town in September 2005, and Taunton Town in January 2006, before making his Conference debut in the 3–1 home win over Dagenham & Redbridge in April 2006. Also in the same month Seaborne scored his first career goal, a header from a corner, in the 4–0 home win against Crawley Town. He was rewarded with a new one-year contract, but, unable to get a regular place in the team, was loaned out again, this time to Conference South side Dorchester Town.
In June 2007 he signed a new one-year deal, but a broken leg sustained as the result of a bad tackle in a pre-season friendly against South West Peninsula League side Bodmin Town kept him out for three months. Once restored to the team, he formed a successful defensive partnership with Matt Taylor, was handed the captaincy, and led them to promotion via the play-off final, in which they beat Cambridge United 1–0. Seaborne signed a new two-year contract before the 2008–09 season, and was a regular in the side as Exeter were again promoted, this time to Football League One.

Southampton
On 13 January 2010, Seaborne signed for Southampton for an undisclosed fee on a -year contract. He made his debut on 16 January playing alongside two other recent signings, José Fonte and Jon Otsemobor, in a 1–1 draw at Millwall. Seaborne, alongside seven other professional players was released by Southampton in June 2013.

Loans
On 9 November 2012, Seaborne joined Charlton on a one-month loan deal. On 17 January 2013, he joined AFC Bournemouth on loan for the remainder of the season.

Yeovil Town
On 19 July 2013, he signed for newly promoted Championship side Yeovil Town on a two-year contract, following his release from Southampton. Seaborne made his Yeovil debut, on 3 August 2013, in their 1–0 Championship victory over Millwall.

On 28 November 2013, Seaborne joined Football League One side Coventry City on loan until 5 January 2014.

Coventry City
On 14 January 2014, Seaborne joined Coventry City permanently after a successful loan spell. He scored his first goal for Coventry in a 1–0 win against Stevenage on 26 March 2014. However, he left on 8 August 2014, after his contract was terminated by mutual consent.

Partick Thistle
On 11 August 2014, Seaborne signed for Scottish Premiership club Partick Thistle, agreeing a two-year contract. He scored his first goal for Thistle in a 1–1 draw against Kilmarnock at Firhill in December 2014. Seaborne scored his second Partick Thistle goal in a 2–1 win against St Mirren in the Scottish Cup.

When his contract expired in May 2016, Seaborne was one of several players who quit the club.

Mohun Bagan
On 4 August 2016, it was reported that Seaborne had joined Kolkata-based Mohun Bagan of the I-League. However, only a few days later, after one training session, it was reported that Seaborne had left Mohun Bagan to attend a trial with Superleague Greece side, Olympiacos. He had never officially signed a contract with Mohun Bagan or Olympiacos.

Hamilton Academical
On 24 August 2016, Seaborne returned to Scotland to sign for Hamilton Academical. He was released at the end of the season.

Return to Exeter City
On 1 December 2017, it was announced by Exeter City that Seaborne had rejoined the club.

He was released by Exeter at the end of the 2017–18 season.

Derry City
Seaborne joined League of Ireland Premier Division club Derry City in July 2018, signing a contract until the end of the 2018 season.

Career statistics

A.  The "Other" column constitutes appearances (including substitutes) and goals in the Football League Trophy, FA Trophy, 2008 Conference Premier play-off Final.

Personal life
On 1 September 2011, Seaborne was the victim of a serious assault outside a nightclub in Southampton. He received treatment at Southampton General Hospital.

References

External links

1987 births
Living people
Sportspeople from Barnstaple
English footballers
Association football defenders
Exeter City F.C. players
Tiverton Town F.C. players
Taunton Town F.C. players
Dorchester Town F.C. players
National League (English football) players
English Football League players
Southampton F.C. players
Charlton Athletic F.C. players
AFC Bournemouth players
Yeovil Town F.C. players
Coventry City F.C. players
Partick Thistle F.C. players
Hamilton Academical F.C. players
Scottish Professional Football League players
Derry City F.C. players